Gomphogyne cissiformis is a species of flowering plant in the family Cucurbitaceae, native to the Himalayas, Assam, Yunnan, and Vietnam. Its fruit is edible and is collected in the wild by local peoples.

References

Cucurbitaceae
Flora of West Himalaya
Flora of Nepal
Flora of East Himalaya
Flora of Assam (region)
Flora of Yunnan
Flora of Vietnam
Plants described in 1845